Patton Island may refer to:

Patton Island (Alabama), an island in Lauderdale County
Patton Island (Alaska), an island in Aleutians East Borough